Sangili may refer to

Sangili (1982 film), an Indian film
Sangili (2019 film), a Sri Lankan film
Sangili Murugan, an Indian film actor, scriptwriter and producer